Radio Lives was a long running BBC Radio 4 biographical series consisting of portraits of great radio figures. Running over seven series from 1990–96, each episode featured a personality who was influential either on the air or behind the scenes, and was presented by someone with a keen interest in their subject. The programmes demonstrated a striking range of subjects as varied as Edward R. Murrow (the voice of Britain for an American radio audience at the height of the London blitz) to Kenneth Williams, and William Hardcastle (inaugural presenter of The World at One) to Nancy Spain (socialite). Presenters have included Patricia Routledge, Charles Kennedy, Mark Lawson and Humphrey Carpenter.

Programmes

Series 1, 19 July – 23 August 1990

Series 2, 23 May – 20 June 1991

Series 3, 6 August – 10 September 1992

Series 4, 27 May – 1 July 1993

Series 5, 9 June – 14 July 1994

Series 6, 29 June – 3 August 1995

Series 7, 31 October – 5 December 1996

References

BBC Radio 4 programmes
1990 radio programme debuts
1996 radio programme endings